Tony Randazzo may refer to:

 Tony Randazzo (bishop), auxiliary bishop of the Roman Catholic Archdiocese of Sydney
 Tony Randazzo (umpire) (born 1965), American baseball umpire